Tychus is a genus of beetles belonging to the family Staphylinidae.

The species of this genus are found in Europe and Northern America.

Species:
 Tychus aculeatus (Schuster & Marsh, 1958) 
 Tychus adustus (Schuster & Marsh, 1958)

References

Staphylinidae
Staphylinidae genera